Robert Kaplan may refer to:

 Robert D. Kaplan, American author
 Robert S. Kaplan (born 1940), business theorist and professor of accounting at Harvard Business School
 Robert Steven Kaplan (born 1957), former president of the Federal Reserve Bank of Dallas and professor of management practice at Harvard Business School
 Robert Kaplan (mathematician) (1933–2021), writer and teacher, including teaching mathematics at Harvard
 Bob Kaplan (1936–2012), Canadian Liberal MP